Vicente Ridaura (born 22 August 1963) is a Spanish former professional racing cyclist. He rode in three editions of the Tour de France, two editions of the Giro d'Italia and four editions of the Vuelta a España.

Major results

1986
 1st Memorial Manuel Galera
 1st Stage 9 Vuelta a Castilla y León
 7th Trofeo Masferrer
1987
 2nd Clásica a los Puertos de Guadarrama
1988
 3rd Klasika Primavera
1989
 1st Overall Tour of Galicia
1st Stage 3
 6th Overall Volta a Portugal
1991
 3rd Overall Volta a Portugal
1st Stage 4
 5th Overall Vuelta a los Valles Mineros
1992
 1st Stage 9 Volta a Portugal

Grand Tour general classification results timeline

References

External links
 

1963 births
Living people
Spanish male cyclists
Sportspeople from Valencia
Cyclists from the Valencian Community